Raden Kodijat was the recipient of the 1961 Ramon Magsaysay Award for his dedicated and skillful direction of the massive yaws eradication effort that is freeing his countrymen from a disfiguring and crippling disease.

References

Ramon Magsaysay Award winners
Year of birth missing
Year of death missing